Surattha albistigma is a moth in the family Crambidae. It is found in Taiwan.

References

Ancylolomiini
Moths described in 1918
Moths of Taiwan